Ptilometra is a genus of echinoderms belonging to the monotypic family Ptilometridae.

The species of this genus are found in Australia.

Species:

Ptilometra australis 
Ptilometra macronema

References

Comatulida
Crinoid genera